The 2011 Nippon Professional Baseball (NPB) Draft was held on October 27, for the 47th time at the Grand Prince Hotel Takanawa to assign amateur baseball players to the NPB. It was arranged with the special cooperation of Toshiba with official naming rights. The draft was officially called "The Professional Baseball Draft Meeting supported by TOSHIBA ".It has been sponsored by Toshiba for the 3rd consecutive year since 2009.

Summary 
Only the first round picks will be done by bid lottery. After the second round, waver selections were made in order from the lowest-ranked team of the 2011 season in both the Central League and Pacific League, the third round was reversed and selections were made from the top team, and the fourth round was reversed again, alternating with selections from the lowest-ranked team until all teams had finished selecting players.

Since the  season, the winner of the NPB All-Star Game has determined whether the Central League or the Pacific League gets waiver preference after the second round. In the 2011 All-Star Game, the Pacific League won two games, so the Pacific League was given waiver priority over the Central League.

The Yomiuri Giants publicly announced that they would pick Tomoyuki Sugano, the nephew of the Giants' manager Tatsunori Hara, in the first round, which caused other teams to shun him, and Sugano was expected to be the Giants' lone pick. However, the Hokkaido Nippon-Ham Fighters pushed for the nomination, and as a result of a lottery bidding with the Giants, the Fighters won the right to negotiate. Sugano did not agree to negotiations with the Fighters and did not join the team. When the fighters won the lots, the audience cheered and applauded. The reason for this was the backlash from the fans after the Giants publicly announced the players they wanted to pick in the first round and used it as a way to deter other teams, picking Hisayoshi Chono in 2009 and Hirokazu Sawamura in 2010 by themselves. The Sugano pick sparked a debate about the significance of the draft system.

First Round Contested Picks 

 Bolded teams indicate who won the right to negotiate contract following a lottery.
 In the first round, Yusuke Nomura (Pitcher) was selected by the Carp, Hayata Ito (Outfielder)  by the Tigers, Ken Togame (Pitcher)  by the Lions, and Shota Takeda (Pitcher) by the Hawks without a bid lottery.
 In the second round, Yoshitaka Muto (Pitcher) was selected by the Eagles, Ryoichi Adachi (Infielder)  by the Buffaloes, and Ryuhei Kawakami (Outfielder) by the Swallows without a bid lottery.
 In the thrird round, the last remaining Baystars  selected Yujoh Kitagata (Pitcher).
 List of selected players.

Selected Players 

The order of the teams is the order of second round waiver priority.
 Bolded After that, a developmental player who contracted as a registered player under control.
 List of selected players.

Chiba Lotte Marines

Yokohama  Baystars

Tohoku Rakuten Golden Eagles

Hiroshima Toyo Carp

Orix Buffaloes

Hanshin Tigers

Saitama Seibu Lions

Yomiuri Giants

Hokkaido Nippon-Ham Fighters

Tokyo Yakult Swallows

Fukuoka SoftBank Hawks

Chunichi Dragons

References

External links 
 プロ野球ドラフト会議 supported by TOSHIBA - NPB.jp Nippon Professional Baseball 

Nippon Professional Baseball draft
Draft
Nippon Professional Baseball draft
Nippon Professional Baseball draft
Baseball in Japan
Sport in Tokyo
Events in Tokyo